Coroglen (Māori: Ōunuora) is a locality in the Coromandel Peninsula, New Zealand. It lies on State Highway 25, 18 kilometres south of Whitianga and 26 kilometres north west of Tairua.  The "Tapu-Coroglen Road", a windy gravel road, connects it across the Coromandel Range with Tapu on the west coast of the peninsula.

History
The town was founded as "Gumtown" in the late 19th century with a kauri sawmill, later becoming an important location in the kauri gum trade. In the early 1900s, Gumtown had three stores, a bakery, a butcher's, a bootmaker, a blacksmith, a hotel, two boarding houses, and a billiard saloon. Currently, Coroglen has a tavern (famous for live music performances), a school, a pre school and a community garden.

Demographics
The SA1 area is part of the larger Mercury Bay South  statistical area.

The SA1 statistical area had a population of 129 at the 2018 New Zealand census, an increase of 3 people (2.4%) since the 2013 census, and an increase of 18 people (16.2%) since the 2006 census. There were 48 households, comprising 69 males and 63 females, giving a sex ratio of 1.1 males per female. The median age was 43.6 years (compared with 37.4 years nationally), with 24 people (18.6%) aged under 15 years, 21 (16.3%) aged 15 to 29, 57 (44.2%) aged 30 to 64, and 27 (20.9%) aged 65 or older.

Ethnicities were 90.7% European/Pākehā, 16.3% Māori, and 2.3% Pacific peoples. People may identify with more than one ethnicity.

Although some people chose not to answer the census's question about religious affiliation, 60.5% had no religion, 20.9% were Christian and 2.3% had other religions.

Of those at least 15 years old, 12 (11.4%) people had a bachelor's or higher degree, and 24 (22.9%) people had no formal qualifications. The median income was $24,300, compared with $31,800 nationally. 6 people (5.7%) earned over $70,000 compared to 17.2% nationally. The employment status of those at least 15 was that 51 (48.6%) people were employed full-time, 18 (17.1%) were part-time, and 3 (2.9%) were unemployed.

Education

Notes

Thames-Coromandel District
Populated places in Waikato
Kauri gum